Cooper County may refer to:
 Cooper County, Missouri, United States
 Cooper County, New South Wales, Australia